The 1975 Nicholls State Colonels football team represented Nicholls State University as a member of the Gulf South Conference (GSC) the 1975 NCAA Division II football season. Led by second-year head coach Bill Clements, the Colonels compiled an overall record of 8–2 with a conference mark of 7–2, winning the GSC title. Nicholls State played home games at John L. Guidry Stadium in John L. Guidry Stadium.

Schedule

References

Nicholls State
Nicholls Colonels football seasons
Gulf South Conference football champion seasons
Nicholls State Colonels football